Kim Smith (23 June 1952 – 16 September 2009) was an Australian rules footballer who played for Prahran in the Victorian Football Association (VFA) and Melbourne in the Victorian Football League (VFL).
 
Smith made his debut at Prahran in 1974 and finished the year as their top goal-kicker with 55 goals. The following season he played for Melbourne but could only manage four appearances. He then returned to Prahran and was their leading goal-kicker every year until his retirement in 1982, eight times in total. His tally of 97 goals in 1979 was the joint most by any player in the league and he shared the leading goal-kicker award with Geelong West's Joe Radojevic. He was also a member of Prahran's 1978 premiership team.

He died in 2009 from lung cancer.

References

Holmesby, Russell and Main, Jim (2007). The Encyclopedia of AFL Footballers. 7th ed. Melbourne: Bas Publishing.

1952 births
2009 deaths
Australian rules footballers from Victoria (Australia)
Melbourne Football Club players
Prahran Football Club players